Zapata: El sueño del héroe is the Soundtrack for the Mexican film Zapata: El sueño del héroe and was released in May 2004, to accompany the release of the film. The lead single was the song "Lucharé por tu amor" by Alejandro Fernández and reached the top 10 of the Billboard Latin Pop Airplay chart.

Track listing 

 Lucharé por tu amor performed by Alejandro Fernández – 4:47
 Llanto performed by Celso Piña – 4:06
 Igual que yo performed by Sin Bandera – 4:16
 Esta vida performed by Tres De Copas – 3:54
 Quédate en mi performed by Lucero – 3:32
 La tierra de mi pueblo performed by Jaime Camil – 3:56
 Morir para vivir performed by Ana Gabriel – 3:40
 Tierra y libertad performed by Reyli Barba – 4:09
 Zapata vive performed by Maria Entraigues – 3:25
 El hombre de maíz (Instrumental) performed by Ruy Folguera – 4:10
 Guerrero sagrado (Instrumental) performed by Ruy Folguera – 5:58

Chart performance

References

Biographical film soundtracks
2004 soundtrack albums
Sony Discos albums